Jynx, known in Japan as , is a Pokémon species in Nintendo and Game Freak's Pokémon franchise. Created by Ken Sugimori, Jynx first appeared in the video games Pokémon Red and Blue and subsequent sequels, later appearing in various merchandise, spinoff titles, or animated and printed adaptations of the franchise. The character is voiced in the anime and other media in Japanese by Mayumi Tanaka and by Rachael Lillis in English.

Jynx's design and humanoid appearance has been criticized by the Western media, including cultural critic Carole Boston Weatherford, who described Jynx as representing blackface after seeing the character's depiction in the anime. Due to complaints, Game Freak modified its appearance by changing the original color of its face from black to the current color, purple.

Design and characteristics
Jynx was one of 151 different designs conceived by Game Freak's character development team and finalized by Ken Sugimori for the first generation of Pocket Monsters games Red and Green, which were localized outside Japan as Pokémon Red and Blue. Originally called "Rujura" in Japanese, Nintendo decided to give the various Pokémon species "clever and descriptive names" related to their appearance or features, when translating the game for western audiences, as a means to make the characters more relatable to American children. As a result, they were renamed "Jynx", a play on the word "jinx". In early development, Jynx originally had a male counterpart based on a yeti, as well as the Kaiju Woo from Ultraman.

Also known as the "Human Shape" Pokémon, Jynx is a female-only species that resembles the Japanese mythical creature Yuki-onna. Originally portrayed with a black face and dark blue hands, Jynx's design was changed to purple coloration after critiques that it perpetuated racism. In addition Jynx have large pink lips, saucer-like eyes, white arms, and long, blonde hair. The "clothes" they appear to wear are actually part of their body, resembling a circular red bra and skirt. Jynx have no visible feet, and in the games leave no footprints. Jynx has a pre-evolution, Smoochum, which evolves into Jynx when it receives enough experience from battles and reaches level 30.

Jynx Pokémon walk in a dance-like fashion, wiggling their hips in a manner described in Red & Blue, as well as in Leaf Green as "seductive". It uses dancing to communicate, with the exact rhythm relying on its emotion at the time. The dance affects people, causing them to themselves dance with no regard to their actions. Jynx speak in a language that only other Jynx can understand, though the sound is described as similar to human speech. This trait is carried on to games where Pokémon speak English such as the Pokémon Mystery Dungeon series, with the text appearing as combinations of "X"s, "O"s, punctuation marks, and/or musical notes, instead of legible words. Jynx are psychic, and can attack either by kissing an opponent or launching "strange orbs" at them, and can protect themselves with a psychically-generated barrier.

Appearances

In video games
Jynx originally appeared in Pokémon Red and Blue, then appeared in other Pokémon games such as Pokémon Yellow, Pokémon Stadium, Pokémon Gold and Silver, Pokémon Crystal, Pokémon Ruby and Sapphire, Pokémon Emerald, Pokémon FireRed and LeafGreen, Pokémon Diamond and Pearl and Pokémon Platinum. The second generation of Pokémon games introduced Smoochum, a baby Pokémon who Jynx evolves from at level 30. Appearing again in Pokémon HeartGold and SoulSilver, Pokémon Black and White, Pokémon Black 2 and White 2, Pokémon X and Y, Pokémon Omega Ruby and Alpha Sapphire, Pokémon Sun and Moon, Pokémon Ultra Sun and Ultra Moon, Pokémon: Let's Go, Pikachu! and Let's Go, Eevee! and Pokémon Sword and Shield.

Outside of the main series, Jynx appears in a majority of Pokémon spin-off titles, including Pokémon Snap, Pokémon Pinball, Pokémon Trozei!, Pokémon Mystery Dungeon: Blue Rescue Team and Red Rescue Team, Pokémon Ranger, Pokémon Mystery Dungeon: Explorers of Time and Explorers of Darkness, Pokémon Mystery Dungeon: Explorers of Sky, Pokémon Ranger: Shadows of Almia, Pokémon Rumble, Pokémon Rumble Blast, Pokémon Rumble U, Pokémon Battle Trozei, Pokémon Shuffle, Pokémon Rumble World , Pokémon Rumble Rush, Pokémon Mystery Dungeon, Pokémon Ranger games, Pokémon Go and New Pokémon Snap. Because of the controversy surrounding Jynx's skin color, it was changed from black to purple in Pokémon Stadium 2 and all subsequent games.

In anime
Jynx first appeared in the Pokémon anime in Holiday Hi-Jynx when one of Santa Claus's Jynx was separated from him, Ash and friends helped to return the Jynx to her owner. The episode was not re-aired in the USA because of the controversy over her appearance. However, it was placed on On-Demand on 2011, thus rendering it available to audiences in the US. Jynx appeared again in the episode The Ice Cave, which was not aired in English-speaking countries for the same reason. Jynx also made a cameo as a doll that Misty wins. Jynx later appears in Pokémon Orange Islands series, in episodes still present in American rotations.

Jynx made an appearance in a contest in All Things Bright and Beautifly. However, because Jynx had been animated with black skin instead of purple, her 13-second appearance was cut from the English dub. Jynx later appears in episodes 116 and 117 of Pokémon: Advanced Generation, with the inoffensive purple skin color. Because the main order of these episodes would have been during February which is also Black History Month, KidsWB chose to air these episodes out of order and air them in April after the Hoenn Championship League episodes as it would help build the ratings with the Grand Festival and Hoenn League episodes and it would have avoided offending people during February due to the Jynx controversy. However one exception was in the episode Hi Ho Silver Wind! where a purple Jynx had a minor cameo which aired in February. These episodes were aired in the normal rotational order in the UK. A trio of Jynx sisters were later depicted in the episode Three Jynx and a Baby. These three Jynx were overly-protective towards their sister, a Smoochum. The Smoochum evolved into a Jynx at the end of the episode.

In printed material
Jynx's most notable role in the Pokémon manga is being under the ownership of Lorelei in Pokémon Adventures. Lorelei's Jynx is noted for having the ability to generate voodoo dolls out of ice using its Ice Beam. When Lorelei draws crosses on any part of the dolls using her lipstick, ice shackles form on the specified body parts of her targets, eventually freezing the victim over completely. Even after the victims are broken free, the freeze induces lasting numbness in the areas where it was applied. Both Red and Sabrina suffered this condition and had to seek a cure atop Mt. Silver by bathing in the hotsprings there. Another ability of Lorelei's Jynx is revealed in the Sevii Islands saga: she can create a wispy band of ice around targets, with which Lorelei can use to track down using her powder case.

Jynx has made a number of appearances in the Pokémon Trading Card Game, with the black-skinned design (sometimes US version cards show up purple and edited before the controversy) before the Weatherford controversy, and with the purple-skinned design after Nintendo regained control of the Pokémon TCG. Jynx first appeared in the Base Set with her black-skinned design, but later reprints of this card have the purple-skinned design.

Controversy and reception

Jynx's original appearance and design have received criticisms in various publications. Children's book author and cultural critic Carole Boston Weatherford published an article in the Greensboro News & Record alleging that Jynx's design bore a striking resemblance to blackface actors, an image which is considered racist against African Americans, and further described the Pokémon as "a dead ringer for an obese drag queen." She further criticized the Pokémon in the magazine Advertising Age, comparing it to Little Black Sambo and suggesting its English name as also a possible derogatory remark towards Black people relating to voodoo (with its original Japanese name, Rougela, being unrelated). The Advertising Age report was later reprinted in an issue of Black People Today. Since then, the Jim Crow Museum at Ferris State University has listed Jynx as an example of racism in modern material. Later, the Jim Crow Museum published a letter by a reader of the aforementioned article, who disagreed with the museum's assertion that Jynx was deliberately racist by design. In response, Game Freak modified Jynx's design in localized versions of the games, a change which would several years later be reflected in the Japanese versions of the games and the anime series. In addition, episodes featuring the older Jynx design were censored or completely removed from televised syndication by Warner Bros. After the anime episode "Three Jynx and a Baby!", Jynx also ceased to physically appear in the anime, although its pre-evolved form, Smoochum, has continued to appear in the anime, even after the aforementioned episode.

Likely as a result of this controversy, Jynx has also been altered in various releases of Pokémon games featuring the black design, with the American Virtual Console rerelease of Pokémon Yellow changing its face and hands to purple, and the Virtual Console rerelease of Pokémon Snap on the Wii and Wii U doing the same.

Criticisms still persist, such as 1UP.com which, in an article discussing the "lamest Pokémon" of the series, referred to it as the "infamous blackface Pokémon". Washington Post writer Mary C. Morton described Jynx as having "explicitly, albeit grossly caricatured, womanly features", and challenged the assertion that the games crossed gender barriers with such. In their podcast, Retronauts, they emphasized it further, noting the design as "creepy" and that it maintained the issue of racism still. IGN also criticized the design, characterizing Jynx as a "transvestite midget in racially offensive makeup". GameDaily ranked it first on their list of the "Top 10 Weirdest Looking Pokémon", noting its design suggested the presence of breasts, and echoing qualms regarding its resemblance to blackface performers. Games.net ranked it fourth on their "Top 10 Disturbingly Sexual Game Characters" list, questioning why the character was clothed in what resembled a "slinky dress and push-up bra". In the book Gaming Cultures and Place in Asia-Pacific, David Surman defended Jynx's design, suggesting that Sugimori developed it—along with Mr. Mime—to draw upon the humor of heta-uma (a term meaning bad/nice). The book notes that the designs "oscillate between the poles of good and bad," and as a result offer diversity within the game and invite scrutiny from players. Jim Sterling of Destructoid included it in their list of 30 "rubbish" Pokémon, and stated "Don’t act like you didn’t know it was f*cking coming." GamesRadar described Magmar and Jynx as the Romeo and Juliet of Pokémon. GamesRadar's Carolyn Gudmundson compared Jynx to the Gothita line due to both's designs being based on an "overtly feminine form", though describing Gothita's line as "way less creepy". Author Loredana Lipperini described Jynx as an "opera singer". Russ Frushtick of Polygon claimed that Jynx is a worst first-gen Pokémon that should be wiped from existence, and further stated that Jynx is just problematic at every turn. Liz Finnegan of The Escapist listed Jynx as worst Pokemon design, and further stated that the problem with Jynx is that she’s not menacing, nor is she cute. Jynx is just plain old ugly. VentureBeat placed Jynx on a list of "seriously ugly Pokémon" from the past twenty years, and claimed that Jynx has always weirded him out. Ben Skipper of International Business Times ranked Jynx as one of the very worst Pokemon designs. Sam Loveidge of Digital Spy listed Jynx as worst Pokémon design ever, and further stated that it got some seriously racist connotations and manages to look just human enough to be totally creepy-looking. Elijah Watson of Complex described Jynx as the best Pokemon, but stated that it is also one of the strangest-looking Pokemon out there, but it can handle its own better than we may think. Patricia Hernandez of Kotaku described Jynx as a literal blackface of Pokemon. In 2016, a Japanese poll voted which Pokémon is the ugliest with Jynx receiving 37 votes and fourth most voted. David Lozada of GameRevolution listed Jynx as the weirdest Pokémon ever, stating that Jynx is the embodiment of weird.

See also

Pokémon episodes removed from rotation, a list of episodes of the anime removed due to various controversies, including an episode removed due to featuring Jynx.
Mr. Popo, another character also labelled as a racist caricature
Mr. Mime, another Pokémon criticised for its humanoid appearance and stereotype.

References

External links
Jynx on Bulbapedia
Jynx on Pokemon.com

Anime and manga controversies
Female characters in anime and manga
Female characters in video games
Fictional psychics
Pokémon species
Race-related controversies in animation
Race-related controversies in television
Race-related controversies in video games
Video game characters introduced in 1996
Video game characters with ice or cold abilities
Fictional monsters
Fictional humanoids

pl:Lista Pokémonów (121-140)#Jynx